Marcelo de Campos Velho Birck (born August 13, 1965) is a Brazilian singer-songwriter, lyricist, arranger and guitarist, best known for his work with influential rock band Graforreia Xilarmônica.

Biography
Birck was born in Porto Alegre, Rio Grande do Sul, on August 13, 1965. He is the nephew of both screenwriter and theater director Carlos Augusto de Campos Velho (better known as Jota Pingo) and film and television actor Paulo César Pereio, and his mother, Rosa Maria de Campos Velho, was the director of the Teatro de Arena de Porto Alegre. Having a penchant for music and arts since his youth, Birck later graduated in music from the Federal University of Rio Grande do Sul, and then obtained a master's degree in music education at the Federal University of Goiás.

In 1983, alongside his younger brother Alexandre Birck, future TNT guitarist Luís "Tchê" Gomes and future Os Cascavelletes bassist Frank Jorge, Marcelo formed the short-lived band Prisão de Ventre, which lasted only for two years. In 1987 he reunited with his brother and Jorge to form, alongside Carlo Pianta, the cult band Graforreia Xilarmônica. After releasing two critically acclaimed albums, Coisa de Louco II (1995) and Chapinhas de Ouro (1998), they broke up in 2000, but reunited after a 5-year hiatus.

In 1988, Birck founded a more experimental and "performatic" side project to Graforreia Xilarmônica, named Aristóteles de Ananias Jr., alongside names such as Luciano Zanatta, Diego Silveira and Chico Machado. They have released a single, self-titled studio album in 1996 before disbanding the following year.

In 2000 Birck teamed up with Thomas Dreher and Felipe Faraco to form Os Atonais; their first (and so far only) studio album, Em Amplitude Moderada, came out the same year, amid overwhelmingly positive reviews. Later that year he released his first, self-titled solo album. A follow-up, Timbres Não Mentem Jamais, came out in 2008.

Birck has also collaborated with Jupiter Apple on his 1997 debut A Sétima Efervescência, arranging one of the musician's most well-known songs, "Eu e Minha Ex". He later returned for its 1999 follow-up Plastic Soda. In 2009 he was a guest musician on Rogério Skylab's live album Skylab IX; he and Skylab (a huge fan of Birck) wrote together the song "Samba de uma Nota Só ao Contrário". From 2002 to 2003 he served as a lecturer of musical analysis for the Santa Catarina State University.

Discography

With Graforreia Xilarmônica
 For a more comprehensive list, see Graforreia Xilarmônica#Discography

With Aristóteles de Ananias Jr.

With Os Atonais

Solo

Guest appearances
Jupiter Apple
 1997: A Sétima Efervescência (orchestral arrangements in "Eu e Minha Ex")
 1999: Plastic Soda (electric guitar and arrangements in "The True Love of the Spider")

Rogério Skylab
 2009: Skylab IX (lyrics, additional vocals and electric guitar in "Samba de uma Nota Só ao Contrário")

References

External links
 Marcelo Birck on Discogs

1965 births
Living people
Brazilian rock singers
Brazilian rock musicians
Musicians from Rio Grande do Sul
People from Porto Alegre
20th-century Brazilian male singers
20th-century Brazilian singers
Brazilian lyricists
Brazilian male guitarists
21st-century Brazilian male singers
21st-century Brazilian singers
Federal University of Rio Grande do Sul alumni
Federal University of Goiás alumni
Brazilian male singer-songwriters